Elin Mattsson (born 21 September 1986 in Torsby), is a Swedish biathlete. Mattsson made her World Cup debut during the 2009/2010 biathlon start in Östersund.

References

Swedish female biathletes
1986 births
Living people